Death of François Levaillant
Death of Blasius Merrem
1824–26 Voyage of the Blonde to the Pacific. The naturalist on board is Andrew Bloxam.
Philipp Franz Balthasar von Siebold  describes the Japanese waxwing in Historiae naturalis in Japonia statu
Hermann Schlegel travels to Vienna in 1824 to attend  the lectures of Leopold Fitzinger and Johann Jacob Heckel.
Jean René Constant Quoy and  Joseph Paul Gaimard describe the austral thrush and variable hawk in Voyage Autour du Monde Exécute sur l'Uranie et la Physicienne pendant les années 1817-1820
1824-1825 Johann Baptist von Spix  Avium Species Novae  published. In this work Spix proposes  the genera Aratinga and Colibri
1824-1827 Christian Ludwig Brehm  commences Ornis oder das neueste und Wichtigste der Vögelkunde the  first ornithological journal.
Death of Alfred Duvaucel collector for the Muséum national d'histoire naturelle

Expeditions
1824-26 Circumnavigation by  the frigate "Le Thétis" and  the corvette "L'Espérance" Hyacinthe de Bougainville (commander), Paul Anne de Norquer du Camper (captain of the Espérance), Edmond de La Touanne (lieutenant on the Thétis and artist), Francois Louis Busseuil (1791-1835 (surgeon and naturalist).

Ongoing events
Coenraad Jacob Temminck Nouveau recueil de planches coloriées d'oiseaux. Birds first described in this work include the scarlet-rumped trogon, the lilac kingfisher, the metallic starling, the red-throated barbet, the lizard buzzard, the red-bearded bee-eater  and the Australian pelican
Louis Jean Pierre Vieillot continues La Galerie des Oiseaux du cabinet d'histoire naturelle du jardin du roi.

Birding and ornithology by year
1824 in science